Revolution Rent is an 2019 American documentary film, directed by Andy Señor Jr. and Victor Patrick Alvarez. It follows Señor Jr., as he prepares an adaption of Rent in Cuba, exploring his homeland and heritage. Neil Patrick Harris and Karim Amer serve as executive producers.

The film had its world premiere at DOC NYC on November 8, 2019. It was released on June 15, 2021, by HBO.

Synopsis
Andy Señor Jr. returns to his homeland of Cuba, as he prepares an adaption of Rent while exploring his heritage and homeland.

Release
The film had its world premiere at DOC NYC on November 8, 2019. In April 2021, HBO Documentary Films acquired distribution rights to the film, and set it for a June 15, 2021, release.

Critical reception

References

External links
 
 
 

2019 films
2019 documentary films
American documentary films
Cuban documentary films
HBO documentary films
2010s American films